Borrowby may refer to:

Borrowby, Hambleton, North Yorkshire, England
Borrowby, Scarborough, North Yorkshire, England